The Queensland Premier's Literary Awards were an Australian suite of literary awards inaugurated in 1999 and disestablished in 2012. It was one of the most generous suites of literary awards within Australia, with $225,000 in prize money across 14 categories with prizes up to $25,000 in some categories. The awards upon their establishment incorporated a number of pre-existing awards including the Steele Rudd Award for the best Australian collection of new short fiction and the David Unaipon Award for unpublished Indigenous writing.

The awards were established by Peter Beattie, the then Premier of Queensland in 1999 and abolished by Premier Campbell Newman, shortly after winning the 2012 Queensland state election.

In response, the Queensland writing community established the Queensland Literary Awards to ensure the Awards continued in some form. The judging panels remained largely the same, and University of Queensland Press committed to continue to publish the winners of the Emerging Queensland Author Manuscript Award and the Unpublished Indigenous Writer, David Unaipon Award.

Fiction Book Award
2011 Reading Madame Bovary, Amanda Lohrey
2010 Summertime, J. M. Coetzee
2009 Wanting by Richard Flanagan
2008 The Spare Room by Helen Garner
2007 Carpentaria by Alexis Wright
2006 The Garden Book by Brian Castro
2005 The Turning by Tim Winton
2004 Elizabeth Costello by J. M. Coetzee
2003 Due Preparations for the Plague by Janette Turner Hospital
2002 The Volcano by Venero Armanno
2001 True History of the Kelly Gang by Peter Carey
2000 Drylands by Thea Astley
1999 Fredy Neptune: A Novel in Verse by Les Murray

Emerging Queensland Author – Manuscript Award
2011 The Beloved, Annah Faulkner
2010 RPM, Noel Mengel
2009 No Award. The prize was shared between four shortlisted authors: Inga Simpson, Rachel Claire, Chris Somerville and Pamela Douglas. Extracts from the shortlisted works were published in the 09:05 issue of Perilous Adventures: The Writer's Magazine.
2008 Omega Park by Amy Vought Barker
2007 Life in the Bus Lane by Ian Commins
2006 The Anatomy of Wings by Karen Foxlee
2005 The Long Road of the Junkmailer by Patrick Holland
2004 An Accidental Terrorist by Steven Lang
2003 The Kingdom Where Nobody Dies by Kimberley Starr
2002 The Lambing Flat by Nerida Newton
2001 Mama Kuma: One Woman, Two Cultures by Deborah Carlyon
2000 The Bone Flute by Nike Bourke
1999 Shoelaces by Jillian Watkinson

Unpublished Indigenous Writer – The David Unaipon Award
2021 Mekauwe=Tears Volume #1 (Notes For Song) 1970-2020, Ngankiburka-mekauwe (Senior Woman of Water) Georgina Williams
2020 The Space Between the Paperbark, Jazz Money
2018 The Making of Ruby Champion, Kirstie Parker
2017 Mirrored Pieces, Lisa Fuller
2016 Dancing Home, Paul Collis
2015 The First Octoroon or Report of an Experimental Child, Andrew Booth
2014 It’s Not Just Black and White, Lesley and Tammy Williams
2013 Heat and Light, Ellen van Neerven
2011 Mazin Grace, Dylan Coleman
2010 Purple Threads, Jeanine Leane
2009 The Boundary by Nicole Watson
2008 Every Secret Thing by Marie Munkara
2007 Skin Painting by Elizabeth Eileen Hodgson
2006 Me, Antman and Fleabag by Gayle Kennedy
2005 Anonymous Premonition by Yvette Holt
2004 Dust on Waterglass by Tara June Winch (published as Swallow the Air)
2003 Whispers of This Wik Woman by Fiona Doyle
2002 Home by Larissa Behrendt
2001 The Mish by Robert Lowe
2000 Bitin' Back by Vivienne Cleven
1999 Of Muse, Meandering and Midnight by Samuel Wagan Watson
1998 Is That You Ruthie? by Ruth Hegarty
1997 When Darkness Falls by John Bodey
1996 Black Angels Red Blood by Steven McCarthy
1995 Warrigal's Way by Warrigal Anderson
1994 The Sausage Tree by Valda Gee and Rosalie Medcraft
1993 Bridge of Triangles by John Muk Muk Burke
1992 Sweet Water, Stolen Land by Philip McLaren
1991 Broken Dreams by Bill Dodd
1990 Caprice: A Stockman's Daughter by Doris Pilkington Garimara
1989 Holocaust Island by Graeme Dixon

Non-Fiction Book Award
2011 An Eye for Eternity: The Life of Manning Clark by Mark McKenna
2010 The Blue Plateau: A Landscape Memoir, Mark Tredinnick
2009 The Tall Man: Death and Life on Palm Island by Chloe Hooper
2008 Muck by Craig Sherborne
2007 Slicing the Silence: Voyaging to Antarctica by Professor Tom Griffiths
2006 Packer's Lunch by Neil Chenoweth
2005 Papunya – A Place Made After the Story by Geoffrey Bardon and James Bardon
2004 A Death in Brazil by Peter Robb
2003 Meeting of the Waters by Margaret Simons
2002 The Boyds: A Family Biography by Brenda Niall
2001 A Fine and Private Place by Brian Matthews

History Book Award – Faculty of Arts, University of Queensland Award 
2011 Northern Voyagers: Australia's monsoon coast in maritime history, Alan Powell
2010 Sydney Harbour: A history, Ian Hoskins
2009 Stella Miles Franklin by Jill Roe
2008 Drawing the Global Colour Line by Professor Marilyn Lake and Professor Henry Reynolds
2007 Iron Kingdom by Christopher Clark
2006 Arthur Tange: The Last of the Mandarins by Peter Edwards
2005 The Sounds of Slavery: Discovering African History Through Songs, Sermons and Speech by Shane White and Graham White
2004 Dancing with Strangers by Inga Clendinnen
2003 Mussolini by Professor R. J. B. Bosworth
2002 Gallipoli by Les Carlyon
2001 The Colonial Earth by Tim Bonyhady
2000 John Curtin: A Life by David Day
1999 The Sky Travellers by Bill Gammage

Children's Book Award – Mary Ryan's Award
2011 Just a Dog by Michael Gerard Bauer
2010 Toppling by Sally Murphy
2009 Little Blue by Gaye Chapman
2008 The Peasant Prince by Li Cunxin and Anne Spudvilas
2007 Layla Queen of Hearts by Glenda Millard
2006 The Slightly Bruised Glory of Cedar B. Hartley (who can't help flying high and falling in deep) by Martine Murray
2005 Camel Rider by Prue Mason
2004 Dragonkeeper by Carole Wilkinson
2003 Rain May and Captain Daniel by Catherine Bateson
2002 Blat Magic by Michael Stephens
2001 Fox by Margaret Wild and Ron Brooks
2000 The Family Tree by Jane Godwin
1999 Unseen by Paul Jennings

Young Adult Book Award
2011 Being Here by Barry Jonsberg
2010 Drink the Air by Richard Yaxley
2009 A Small Free Kiss in the Dark by Glenda Millard
2008 Requiem for a Beast by Matt Ottley
2007 One Whole and Perfect Day by Judith Clarke
2006 The Red Shoe by Ursula Dubosarsky
2005 Secret Scribbled Notebooks by Joanne Horniman
2004 How to Make a Bird by Martine Murray
2003 Boys of Blood and Bone by David Metzenthen
2002 When Dogs Cry by Markus Zusak

Science Writers – Department of State Development, Trade and Innovation Award
2011 Voyage to the Planets – Episodes 1, 2 and 3 – Mars, Jupiter and Saturn, Richard Smith
2010 Catching Cancer, Sonya Pemberton
2009 Pasteur's Gambit: Louis Pasteur, The Australasian Rabbit Plague and a Ten Million Dollar Prize by Stephen Dando-Collins
2008 Why is Uranus Upside Down? (and other Questions about the Universe) by Professor Fred Watson
2007 Crude by Richard Smith
2006 Good Health in the 21st Century by Carole Hungerford
2005 Stem Cells by Elizabeth Finkel
2004 Genius of Junk by Sonya Pemberton

Poetry Collection – Arts Queensland Judith Wright Calanthe Award
2021 Terminally Ill, Ouyang Yu
2020 Heide, Pi O
2019 Blakwork, Alison Whittaker
2018 I Love Poetry, Michael Farrell
2017 Fragments, Antigone Kefala
2016 Anatomy of Voice, David Musgrave
2015 Waiting For the Past, Les Murray
2014 Earth Hour, David Malouf
2012 Crimson Crop, Peter Rose (poet)
2011 Starlight: 150 poems, John Tranter
2010 Apocrypha, Peter Boyle
2009 The Striped World by Emma Jones
2008 Typewriter Music by David Malouf
2007 The Passenger by Laurie Duggan
2006 The New Arcadia by Professor John Kinsella
2005 The Ship by Sarah Day
2004 Wolf Notes by Judith Beveridge

Australian Short Story Collection – Arts Queensland Steele Rudd Award
2021 Ordinary Matter, Laura Elvery
2020 Lucky Ticket, Joey Bui
2019 Zebra, Debra Adelaide 
2018 Pulse Points, Jennifer Down
2017 The Circle and the Equator, Kyra Giorgi
2016 A Few Days in the Country and Other Stories, Elizabeth Harrower and The High Places, Fiona McFarlane 
2015 Merciless Gods, Christos Tsiolkas
2014 Only the Animals, Ceridwen Dovey
2013 Like A House On Fire, Cate Kennedy 
2012 Forecast: Turbulence, Janette Turner Hospital  
2011 Reading Madame Bovary, Amanda Lohrey
2010 Little White Slips, Karen Hitchcock
2009 The Boat by Nam Le
2008 Someone Else by John Hughes
2007 Every Move You Make by David Malouf
2006 A Funny Thing Happened at 27 000 Feet by Craig Cormick
2005 Vincenzo's Garden by John Clanchy
2004 Mahjar by Eva Sallis

Literary Work Advancing Public Debate – the Harry Williams Award
2012 The Australian Moment, George Megalogenis
2011 Into the Woods: The Battle for Tasmania's Forests, Anna Krien
2010 Requiem for a Species: Why we resist the truth about climate change, Clive Hamilton
2009 Code of Silence by Sarah Ferguson
2008 In My Shoes by Quentin McDermott and Steve Taylor
2007 Jonestown by Chris Masters
2006 Asbestos House by Gideon Haigh
2005 Sickness in the System by Hedley Thomas
2004 The History Wars by Stuart Macintyre and Anna Clark
2003 Dark Victory by David Marr and Marian Wilkinson
2002 In Denial: The Stolen Generations and the Right by Robert Manne and Reconciliation: A Journey by Michael Gordon
2001 Borderline: Australia's Treatment of Refugees and Asylum Seekers by Peter Mares and Dossier Inside the ABC by David Fagan and Dossier Team
2000 Why Weren't We Told by Henry Reynolds
1999 The Moment the Laughter Died by Tony Koch

Film Script – the Pacific Film and Television Commission Award
2011 The Hunter by Alice Addison
2010 South Solitary by Shirley Barrett
2009 Mary and Max by Adam Elliot
2008 Prime Mover by David Caesar
2007 Lake Mungo by Joel Anderson
2006 Ten Canoes by Rolf de Heer
2005 Little Fish by Jacquelin Perske
2004 Look Both Ways by Sarah Watt
2003 Japanese Story by Alison Tilson
2002 The Tracker by Rolf de Heer
2001 Rabbit-Proof Fence by Christine Olsen
2000 Praise by Andrew McGahan
1999 Two Hands by Gregor Jordan

Television Script – QUT Creative Industries Award
2011 Paper Giants: The Birth of Cleo – Part 2 by Christopher Lee
2010 Sisters of War by John Misto
2009 False Witness by Peter Gawler
2008 Underbelly, Episode 7 – Wise Monkeys by Felicity Packard
2007 Bastard Boys by Sue Smith
2006 Unfolding Florence by Katherine Thomson
2005 RAN: Remote Area Nurse – Episode 5 – Blue Hawaii by Sue Smith
2004 The Cooks – Episode 12, Series 1 – Honey and Wounds by Blake Ayshford

Drama Script (Stage) Award
2012/2013 Trollop by Maxine Mellor
2011 Life Without Me by Daniel Keene
2009 Realism by Paul Galloway
2008 When the Rain Stops Falling by Andrew Bovell
2007 Embers by Campion Decent
2006 Mrs Petrov's Shoe by Noelle Janaczewska
2005 Black Hands/Dead Section by Van Badham
2004 Run Rabbit Run by Alana Valentine
2003 Last Cab to Darwin by Reg Cribb
2002 Old Masters by Beatrix Christian
2001 Meat Party by Duong Le Quy
2000 Box the Pony by Leah Purcell and Scott Rankin
1999 Who's Afraid of the Working Class by Andrew Bovell, Melissa Reeves, Patricia Cornelius and Christos Tsiolkas

Encouragement and Development Prize
2005 The Comfort of Figs by Simon Cleary

References

External links
 
 2007 Qld Premier's Literary Award Winners Queensland Government, Department of Premier and Cabinet (Retrieved 3 October 2007)
 Premier Beattie Announces Winning Words in Rich Literary Awards (11 September 2007) Queensland Government, Ministerial Statements (Retrieved 7 October 2007)
 Queensland Literary Awards

Australian fiction awards
Awards established in 1999
Awards disestablished in 2012
Australian non-fiction book awards
Australian history awards
1999 establishments in Australia
2012 disestablishments in Australia